Crenatocetus (from Latin: crena, "notch", and cetus, "whale") is an extinct genus of protocetid early whale containing one species, Crenatocetus rayi, that lived along the Atlantic Coastal Plain of the United States during the Lutetian in the late middle Eocene.  The species is named in honour of paleontologist Clayton E. Ray, former curator at the National Museum of Natural History.

Georgiacetus (from Georgia) is an older and more primitive close relative, while Pappocetus (from Nigeria) is a younger and more derived relative.

The holotype USNM 392014, recovered in 1985 in a truck load of "marine marl" probably transported from New Bern, North Carolina, is two incomplete dentaries with a left P4 and broken M1-3; a right partial P4, partial M1-2, and a complete M3.  The type locality is the Martin Marietta New Bern Quarry, Craven County, North Carolina  (paleocoordinates ).

References

Protocetidae
Fossil taxa described in 2008
Prehistoric monotypic mammal genera
Prehistoric cetacean genera
Extinct mammals of North America